Jean-Emmanuel Effa Owona (born 26 December 1983 in Cameroon) is a Cameroonian footballer who last played as a striker for Negeri Sembilan FA in the Malaysia Premier League.

Club career

Owona previously played for FC Metz in the Ligue 2 of France. He also has played for club in Turkey's Super Lig such as Elazigspor, Ankaragücü and Malatyaspor.

Malaysia

Owona signed to play for Negeri Sembilan FA in the 2012 Malaysia Super League. On his debut in Malaysian football, he managed to score two goals, thus giving a 2–1 win over Kelantan FA in the 2012 Malaysia Charity Shield. This was Negeri Sembilan's first Charity Shield title since 1985. With Negeri Sembilan, Owona would end the season joint top scorer in the league, with 15 goals. He joined Terengganu FA for the 2013 Malaysia Super League season. However, after only a season with Terengganu, he returned to Negeri Sembilan, who were just relegated from the Super League and playing in the 2014 Malaysia Premier League.

References

External links

FC Metz profile

1983 births
Living people
Cameroonian footballers
Altay S.K. footballers
Elazığspor footballers
Malatyaspor footballers
MKE Ankaragücü footballers
LB Châteauroux players
US Créteil-Lusitanos players
FC Metz players
Negeri Sembilan FA players
Terengganu FC players
Ligue 1 players
Ligue 2 players
Expatriate footballers in Qatar
Süper Lig players
Cameroonian expatriate footballers
Expatriate footballers in France
Expatriate footballers in Turkey
Association football forwards
Cameroonian expatriate sportspeople in Turkey
Al-Sailiya SC players
Cameroonian expatriate sportspeople in Qatar
Qatar Stars League players
Expatriate footballers in Iraq
Cameroonian expatriate sportspeople in Iraq
Cameroon international footballers